"Aria" is a 1975 song composed by Dario Baldan Bembo (music) and  Sergio Bardotti (lyrics). The song marked the solo debut as a singer of Dario Baldan Bembo, a former Equipe 84 member already well known as a session-man and a composer. The song was major hit, ranking #2 on the Italian hit parade.

The song was covered by numerous artists, including Sheila, Shirley Bassey, Michel Legrand, Herbie Mann.

Track listing

 7" single – ZCVE 50420 
 "Aria"  (Dario Baldan Bembo, Sergio Bardotti)
 "Nico" (Dario Baldan Bembo, Sergio Bardotti)

Charts

References

1975 singles
1975 songs
Dario Baldan Bembo songs
Songs written by Sergio Bardotti
Songs written by Dario Baldan Bembo